Ikechuku "Ike" Ndukwe  (born July 17, 1982) is a former NFL offensive lineman who played in the National Football League. He was signed by the New Orleans Saints as an undrafted free agent in 2005. He played college football at Northwestern University.

Ikechuku Ndukwe also played for the Washington Redskins, Baltimore Ravens, Miami Dolphins, Kansas City Chiefs, New York Giants, and San Diego Chargers. He is the older brother of former NFL safety Chinedum Ndukwe.

References

External links
Kansas City Chiefs bio
Northwestern Wildcats bio

1982 births
Living people
People from Dublin, Ohio
Players of American football from Ohio
American football offensive tackles
American football offensive guards
American football centers
Northwestern Wildcats football players
New Orleans Saints players
Washington Redskins players
Baltimore Ravens players
Miami Dolphins players
Kansas City Chiefs players
American sportspeople of Nigerian descent
American people of Igbo descent
Igbo sportspeople
Nigerian players of American football